Poljane pri Žužemberku is a small settlement on the left bank of the Krka River in the Municipality of Žužemberk in southeastern Slovenia. The area belongs to the traditional region of Lower Carniola. The municipality is now included in the Southeast Slovenia Statistical Region.

Name
The name of the settlement was changed from Poljane to Poljane pri Žužemberku in 1953.

References

External links

Poljane pri Žužemberku at Geopedia

Populated places in the Municipality of Žužemberk